is a Japanese computer scientist specializing in natural language processing and text mining, particularly in the field of biology and bioinformatics.

Education
Tsujii received his Bachelor of Engineering, Master of Engineering and PhD degrees in electrical engineering from Kyoto University in 1971, 1973, and 1978 respectively. He was Assistant Professor and Associate Professor at Kyoto University, before accepting a position as Professor of Computational Linguistics at the University of Manchester Institute of Science and Technology (UMIST) in 1988. He was President of the Association for Computational Linguistics (ACL) in 2006, and has been a permanent member of the International Committee on Computational Linguistics (ICCL) since 1992.

Research
Since May 2015, Tsujii has been the director of the Artificial Intelligence Research Center at the National Institute of Advanced Industrial Science and Technology, Japan. Tsujii was previously a Principal Researcher at Microsoft Research Asia (MSRA). Before joining MSRA, he was a professor at the University of Tokyo, where he belonged to both the School of Inter-faculty Initiative on Informatics and the Graduate School of Information Science and Technology. Tsujii is also a Visiting Professor and Scientific Advisor at the National Centre for Text Mining (NaCTeM) at the University of Manchester in the United Kingdom.

Awards
On 14 May 2010, Tsujii was awarded the Medals of Honor with Purple Ribbon, one of Japan's highest awards, presented to influential contributors in the fields of art, academics or sports.

In September 2014, Tsujii was awarded the FUNAI Achievement Award at the Forum on Information Technology (FIT), which took place at the University of Tsukuba.  The award is presented to distinguished individuals engaged in research or related business activities in the field of Information Technology who have produced excellent achievements in the field, are still active in leading positions and have strong impact on young students and researchers.

In December 2014, Tsujii was named as an ACL Fellow, in recognition of his significant contributions to MT, parsing by unification-based grammar and text mining for biology.

Selected publications

References

1949 births
Living people
Japanese computer scientists
Researchers in distributed computing
Academic staff of the University of Tokyo
Academic staff of Kyoto University
Kyoto University alumni
Computational linguistics researchers
People associated with the Department of Computer Science, University of Manchester
Fellows of the Association for Computational Linguistics
Natural language processing researchers
Data miners
Presidents of the Association for Computational Linguistics